Jim Creek is a stream in the U.S. state of South Dakota. It is a tributary of Boxelder Creek.

Jim Creek has the name of Jim Riley, a pioneer settler.

See also
List of rivers of South Dakota

References

Rivers of Lawrence County, South Dakota
Rivers of Meade County, South Dakota
Rivers of South Dakota